"I Know You" is a song by British singer Craig David, featuring the British indie pop band Bastille. It was written by David, Dan Smith, Fraser Thorneycroft-Smith, and Helen "Carmen Reece" Culver for his seventh studio album, The Time Is Now (2018), with production helmed by Thorneycroft-Smith under his pseudonyme Fraser T Smith. The song was released on 23 November 2017, as the second single from the album and reached number five on the UK Singles Chart.

Background
"I Know You" is the first collaboration between David and Bastille. The official audio for the song was released on David's official YouTube account on 23 November 2017.

Music video
The music video for the song first premiered on 4 January 2018 on NMEs official website, before later being uploaded to YouTube. It features David and Smith (of Bastille) at a party. Another David song, "For the Gram" can be heard at the beginning in the background. Directed by Alex Southam, "I Know You" video finds David at a basement party where he takes shots, sings karaoke and just enjoys moments with his friends.

Live performances
David and Smith performed the song live for the first time on Sounds Like Friday Night on 24 November 2017 and later performed it on the Strictly Come Dancing results show on 10 December 2017 and the Top of the Pops New Year's Eve special on 31 December 2017. David performed the song solo on The Last Leg on 26 January 2018.

Track listing
All tracks written by Craig David, Dan Smith, Fraser T Smith, and Helen "Carmen Reece" Culver.

Notes
  signifies an additional producer

Charts

Weekly charts

Year-end charts

Certifications

Release history

References

2017 songs
Craig David songs
Bastille (band) songs
Songs written by Craig David
Songs written by Dan Smith (singer)
2017 singles
Songs written by Fraser T. Smith